Moses Griffith (6 April 1747 – 11 November 1819) was a Welsh draughtsman, engraver and watercolourist.

Griffith was born at Trygarn House in the parish of Bryncroes on the Llŷn Peninsula, Caernarfonshire. His parents were of humble station, and he received a very elementary education but his artistic talent led to his being taken into service by Thomas Pennant about 1769. Pennant helped him to study drawing and engraving, and Griffith became his constant companion on his tours and excursions, making the drawings and engravings for Pennant's numerous works. Griffith became proficient both as a draughtsman and as an engraver. Griffith accompanied Pennant during his Tour of Wales and also visited Scotland, this became a basis of his career between 1769-1790. After Thomas' death, Griffith was employed by his son David and produced nearly 200 watercolors in Wales for him between 1805-1813.

On leaving Pennant's service he settled at Wibnant, near Holyhead, where he obtained plenty of employment as an engraver. He was alive in 1809, when he wrote a letter defending himself from an attack to the Gentleman's Magazine. Francis Grose employed Griffith to engrave some of the plates in his Antiquities.

Griffith also painted watercolours of Welsh scenes, churches, country houses, and portraits, including two self-portraits. His work is to be found in National Museum of Wales, British Museum and the Victoria and Albert Museum.

Works

References

Further reading

1747 births
1819 deaths
Welsh engravers
British draughtsmen
18th-century engravers
19th-century engravers
People from Caernarfonshire